Aliabad (also Romanized as ‘Alīābād and ‘Ālīābād) is a village in Sigar Rural District, in the Central District of Lamerd County, Fars Province, Iran. At the 2006 census, its population was 376, in 85 families.

References 

Populated places in Lamerd County